The 12th Manitoba Dragoons is an armoured regiment of the Canadian Army that is currently on the Supplementary Order of Battle.

Lineage

12th Manitoba Dragoons
Originated 1 July 1903 in Brandon, Manitoba, as the 12th "Manitoba Dragoons".
Amalgamated 31 January 1935 with The Border Horse, retaining its designation as the 12th Manitoba Dragoons.
Redesignated 7 November 1940 as the 12th (Reserve) Manitoba Dragoons.
Redesignated 1 April 1946 as the 18th Armoured Car Regiment (12th Dragoons), RCAC.
Redesignated 4 February 1949 as the 12th Manitoba Dragoons, (18th Armoured Car Regiment).
Redesignated 1 October 1954 as the 12th Manitoba Dragoons (18th Armoured Regiment).
Redesignated 19 May 1958 as the 12th Manitoba Dragoons.
31 December 1964 reduced to nil strength and transferred to the Supplementary Order of Battle.

The Border Horse

Originated 1 April 1908 in Estevan, Saskatchewan, as the 20th Mounted Rifles.
Redesignated 1 March 1910 as the 20th Border Horse.
Redesignated 15 March 1920 as The Border Horse.
Amalgamated 31 January 1935 with the 12th Manitoba Dragoons.

Lineage Chart

Perpetuations

North-West Rebellion, 1885 
95th Battalion, Manitoba Grenadiers

The Great War 
6th Battalion (Fort Garrys), CEF
32nd Battalion, CEF

Operational history

North West Rebellion
The 95th Battalion Manitoba Grenadiers was mobilized for active service on 10 April 1885, when "a Battalion at Winnipeg" was authorized to be formed. The battalion served in the Alberta Column of the North West Field Force and was removed from active service on 18 September 1885. The battalion was retained on the Non-Permanent Active Militia order of battle.

South African War
During the Boer War, The Manitoba Dragoons contributed volunteers for the Canadian contingents in the field.

The Great War
During the Great War, the Regiment raised two battalions for the Canadian Expeditionary Force.

The 6th Battalion (Fort Garry Horse), CEF was authorized on 10 August 1914, and embarked for Britain on 29 September 1914. It formed the nucleus of the Remount Depot on 20 January 1915, and the remainder of the battalion's personnel were absorbed by the Canadian Cavalry Depot, CEF, on 6 March 1915 to provide reinforcements for the Canadian Corps in the field. The battalion was disbanded on 5 April 1918. The battalion recruited in Portage la Prairie, Roblin, Pipestone and Winnipeg, Manitoba, Lloydminster, Saskatchewan and Pincher Creek, Alberta, and was mobilized at Camp Valcartier, Quebec. The 6th Battalion was awarded the battle honour "THE GREAT WAR 1914-15." The 6th Battalion was commanded by Lt.-Col. J.G. Rattray

The 32nd Battalion, CEF, was authorized on 3 November 1914 and embarked for Britain on 23 February 1915. It was redesignated the 32nd Reserve Battalion, CEF, on 18 April 1915 and on 4 January 1917 its personnel were absorbed by the 15th Reserve Battalion, CEF, to provide reinforcements for Canadian Corps units in the field.
The battalion recruited in Manitoba and Saskatchewan and was mobilized at Winnipeg.

The 32nd Battalion had three officers commanding:
Lt.-Col. H.J. Cowan, 7 March 1915 – 15 September 1915
Lt.-Col. C.D. MacPherson, 15 September 1915 – 1 August 1916
Lt.-Col. F.J. Clarke, 2 August 1915 – 2 January 1917

The battalion was awarded the battle honour "THE GREAT WAR 1915-17."

The Second World War
During the Second World War the Regiment mobilized the 18th (Manitoba) Reconnaissance Battalion, CAC, CASF, for active service on 10 May 1941. It was redesignated the 18th (Manitoba) Armoured Car Regiment, CAC, CASF, on 26 January 1942; the 18th Armoured Car Regiment (12th Manitoba Dragoons), CAC, CASF, on 16 December 1942; and 18th Armoured Car Regiment (12th Manitoba Dragoons), RCAC, CASF on 2 August 1945. It embarked for Great Britain on 19 August 1942. On 8 and 9 July 1944 it landed in Normandy, France as a unit attached directly to II Canadian Corps, where it fought in North-West Europe until the end of the war.

Post-1945
The active unit was disbanded on 31 January 1946. The militia regiment was re-activated and was designated the 18th Armoured Car Regiment (12th Dragoons), RCAC on 1 April 1946. The regiment was reduced to nil strength and transferred to the Supplementary Order of Battle on 31 December 1964.

Organization

12th Manitoba Dragoons (01 July, 1903) 

 Regimental Headquarters (Brandon, Manitoba)
 A Squadron (Virden, Manitoba) (first raised 10 April 1885 as No. 2 Company, Winnipeg Battalion of Infantry; later reorganized as B Squadron, Canadian Mounted Rifles)
 B Squadron (Souris, Manitoba) (first raised 4 January 1889 as No. 6 Company, 91st Battalion Manitoba Light Infantry; later reorganized as C Squadron, Canadian Mounted Rifles)
 C Squadron (Portage la Prairie, Manitoba) (first raised 1 June 1901 as D Squadron, Canadian Mounted Rifles)
 D Squadron (Minnedosa, Manitoba) (first raised 1 June 1901 as E Squadron, Canadian Mounted Rifles)
 E Squadron (Brandon, Manitoba) (first raised 1 June 1901 as F Squadron, Canadian Mounted Rifles)

12th Manitoba Dragoons (31 January 1935) 

 Regimental Headquarters (Virden, Manitoba)
 A Squadron (Virden, Manitoba)
 B Squadron (Souris, Manitoba)
 C Squadron (Minnedosa, Manitoba)

12th Manitoba Dragoons (1964) 
 Regimental Headquarters (Virden, Manitoba)
 A Squadron (Minnedosa, Manitoba)
 B Squadron (Virden, Manitoba)
 C Squadron (Neepawa, Manitoba)
 D Squadron (Shoal Lake, Manitoba) (disbanded in 1954)

Alliances 

  12th Royal Lancers (Prince of Wales's) (Until 1960)
  9th/12th Royal Lancers (Prince of Wales's) (1960-1964)

Battle honours
In the list below, battle honours in capitals were awarded for participation in large operations and campaigns, while those in lowercase indicate honours granted for more specific battles. Those battle honours followed by a "+" are emblazoned on the regimental guidon.

Cadet corps
2528 Royal Canadian Army Cadet Corps is the only organization that perpetuates the name and insignia of the regiment.   The cadet corps formed October 19, 1954, as the Virden Collegiate Cadet Corps affiliated to and using the insignia of the 12th Manitoba Dragoons.  When the regiment disbanded the corps affiliation changed to that of the 71st Field Battery and shortly after the 26th Field Regiment, Royal Canadian Artillery.  Branch Number 8 of Royal Canadian Legion became sponsor of the corps May 26, 1975, and housed the unit on its premises.  October 3, 1994, the corps resumed its original affiliation and was renamed the XII Manitoba Dragoons Cadet Corps.  The corps continues to parade in the Virden Legion Hall and is composed of youth from many surrounding communities.

Photo gallery

Notable people
 Colonel Sir Daniel Hunter McMillan 
 Donald MacKeen Smith
 David Berman (mobster)
 Lieutenant-General Robert Moncel 
 Lieutenant-Colonel Gordon Churchill 
 Lieutenant Frank Crean

See also 

 List of regiments of cavalry of the Canadian Militia (1900–1920)

References

Media
Regimental History of the 18th Armored Car Regiment (XII Manitoba Dragoons) by C. E. Henry (1945)

External links
 

12th Manitoba Dragoons
Dragoon regiments of Canada
Military units and formations established in 1903
Military units and formations of Manitoba
1903 establishments in Manitoba
1964 disestablishments in Canada
Military units and formations disestablished in 1964
Supplementary Order of Battle